Chemnitzer may refer to:

Chemnitzer concertina, a large, square concertina used for traditional German and polka music
Chemnitzer Land, a former district in the Free State of Saxony, Germany 
Chemnitzer FC, a German football club based in Chemnitz, Saxony 
Chemnitzer BC, a German football club based in Chemnitz, Saxony